The Mercury World Tour is the fourth concert tour by American pop rock band Imagine Dragons in support of their fifth and sixth studio albums Mercury – Acts 1 (2021) and 2 (2022). The tour began on February 6, 2022 at the FTX Arena in Miami, and is scheduled to conclude on September 9, 2023 at the Château de Chambord in Chambord, France.

Background 
Four days after the release of Mercury – Act 1, the band announced that they would embark on a 17-date North American tour, beginning in early February and stretching to March. Pre-sale access was given to American Express Card members on September 7th through September 9th. Tickets went on-sale to the general public on September 10, 2021.

On November 1, 2021, European dates were announced. The European leg will span 2 months and will visit festivals and stadiums. Tickets for the European leg went on-sale on November 5, 2021.  American pop group LANY were initially announced as the opening act for the North American leg of the tour but were dropped shortly after, most likely due to allegations of predatory behavior resurfacing.  On December 10, Imagine Dragons announced that Canadian-American singer Grandson and Danish singer MØ would serve as LANY's replacements.

On December 14, 2021, the band announced twelve Canadian tour dates with AVIV serving as the opening act.

On February 25, 2022, the band announced the cancellation of tour dates in Ukraine and Russia, due to the ongoing Russian invasion of Ukraine.

On March 25, 2022, the band announced a second North American leg of the tour, with Macklemore and Kings Elliot serving as opening acts. On April 6, the band announced that Mother Mother would serve as opening act for the European leg of the tour.

On August 4, 2022, the band announced the shows of South American leg of the tour. However, on October 17, 2022, just one day before they were set to begin, the shows were postponed due to health issues with lead singer Dan Reynolds. The new dates, scheduled to take place in March 2023, were announced in November.

On November 25, 2022, the Live Nation Entertainment announced an additional number of performances in Europe, extending the tour up to September 8, 2023.

Set list 
This set list was taken from the show in Sao Paulo, Rio on February 28, 2023. It may not represent all dates of the tour.

 "My Life"
 "Believer"
 "It's Time"
 "I'm So Sorry
 "Thunder"
 "Birds"
 "Follow You"
 "Natural"
 "Next to me"
 "Wrecked"
 "Amsterdam"
 "I bet my life"
"Whatever It Takes"
 "Sharks"
 "Enemy"
 "Bad Liar"
 "Demons"
 "On Top of the World"
 "Bones"
 "Radioactive"
 "Walking the Wire"
 "My Life" (reprise)

Set list (Festivals) 
This set list was taken from the last show in Paris, France on January 1, 2023. It may not represent all dates of the tour (Setlist Festivals are just the setlist in non soloist concert). 

 "It's Time"
 "Believer"
 "Polaroid" / "Hopeless Opus"
 "Thunder"
 "Amsterdam"
 "I Don't like myself"
 "I'll make it up to you"
 "Follow You"
 "Lonely"
 "Natural"
 "Dull knives"
 "Demons"
 "Bad Liar"
 "Enemy"
 "Bones"
 "Walking the Wire"
 "Radioactive"

Tour dates

Cancelled dates

Notes

References 

2022 concert tours
Imagine Dragons concert tours
Concert tours of North America
Concert tours of Europe
2023 concert tours